Stanisław Kazimierz Masternak (22 February 1946 – 16 August 2022) was a Polish farmer and politician. He served as a member of Sejm from 1993 to 2001.

Born in Samborzec, Masternak attended the Technical School of Agricultural Mechanization, where he later worked at a farm. He served as the starosta for the Sandomierz County from 2006 to 2018. Masternak was honored with the Gold Cross of Merit in 2004. He was also honored with the Order of Polonia Restituta, where he was in the knight's cross organisation in 2013.

Masternak died on 16 August 2022, at the age of 76.

References 

1946 births
2022 deaths
Polish People's Party politicians
20th-century Polish politicians
21st-century Polish politicians
Members of the Polish Sejm 1993–1997
Members of the Polish Sejm 1997–2001
20th-century Polish farmers
People from Sandomierz
Recipients of the Gold Cross of Merit (Poland)
Knights of the Order of Polonia Restituta
21st-century farmers